John Millard Dunn (5 January 1865 – 3 March 1936) was an Australian church organist and choirmaster. He held these positions at St Peter's Cathedral, Adelaide, for 44 years.

History
John Dunn was born in North Adelaide a twin son of John Charles Dunn and his wife Lydia Charlotte Dunn née Smithson, of Barnard Street, North Adelaide. He was educated at John Whinham's North Adelaide Grammar School, and studied piano under Miss Francis of Glenelg, then E. Smith-Hall and Herr Boehm. He was a choirboy at St Peter's Cathedral under Arthur Boult, and was frequently a featured soloist. He also studied organ under Boult and displayed such proficiency that in 1882 he became his assistant. He was in 1883 a finalist for the inaugural Elder Overseas Scholarship to the Royal College of Music, won by Otto Fischer (later Otto Fischer Sobell). He had secured full-time positions with Francis Clark & Sons and the Bank of Australasia, but in 1888 he sailed for London to study with W. de Manby Sergison, organist at St. Peter's, Eaton square, London, then in 1889 he furthered his studies under Sir Frederick Bridge, the great Westminster Abbey organist. On his return to Adelaide he took up teaching at the Adelaide College of Music (later Elder Conservatorium) under Cecil Sharp and I. G. Reimann. He was appointed organist to the cathedral on 1 November 1891, and officiated at the inauguration of the new organ in 1930; the last service at which he presided was just a week before his death at the age of 71 years.
His successor was the Rev. (later Canon) H. P. Finnis.

Other activities
He served as conductor for the Adelaide Orpheus Society and president of the Adelaide Society of Organists.

He was the composer for a stage musical The Mandarin with libretti by Harry Congreve Evans, performed at the Theatre Royal, Adelaide in 1896.

Dunn was a successful teacher of the organ: two students of whom he was particularly proud were Arthur H. Otto, who on occasion filled in as assistant; and Horace Weber, Cathedral organist at Napier, New Zealand.

He taught music theory at Tormore House, a school for girls at North Adelaide.

Recognition
A newspaper once nominated him one of the 15 notable SA musicians of the late 19th and early 20th century: Frederick Bevan, Charles Cawthorne,  E. Harold Davies, J. M. Dunn, Thomas Grigg, Hermann Heinicke, John Horner, E. H. Wallace Packer, Harold S. Parsons, W. R. Pybus, I. G. Reimann, William Silver, C. J. Stevens, Oscar Taeuber, Arthur Williamson

Family
John M. Dunn had four brothers: Frank C. Dunn (his identical twin), banker of Sydney who retired to Mount Lofty; Walter C. Dunn of Launceston, Tasmania; Dr. Spencer S. Dunn, of Bournemouth, England; and George V. S. Dunn, mining engineer, of Isleworth, Middlesex, England.

John M. Dunn married Gertrude Josephine Ann Henning ( – 15 May 1939) of North Adelaide on 29 August 1906. They had two children:
Seymour Dunn, moved to London where he married Hazel Griffith in 1937
Evelyn Young Dunn (10 March 1910 – ) married Donnell Downey, lived at Thorngate

They were not closely related to the early settler Dunns of SA.

References 

1865 births
1936 deaths
Australian choral conductors
Australian classical organists
Male classical organists
Australian music educators